Illiano is an Italian surname. Notable people with the surname include:

Frank Illiano (1928–2014), American mobster
Gioacchino Illiano (1935–2020), Italian Roman Catholic bishop
Raffaele Illiano (born 1977), Italian cyclist

Italian-language surnames